The 1990 Citizen Cup was a women's tennis tournament played on outdoor clay courts at the Am Rothenbaum in Hamburg in West Germany that was part of the Tier II category of the 1990 WTA Tour. It was the 13th edition of the tournament and was held from 30 April until 6 May 1990. First-seeded Steffi Graf won the singles title, her fourth consecutive at the event.

Finals

Singles
 Steffi Graf defeated  Arantxa Sánchez Vicario 5–7, 6–0, 6–1
 It was Graf's 4th singles title of the year and the 48th of her career.

Doubles
 Gigi Fernández /  Martina Navratilova defeated  Larisa Savchenko-Neiland /  Helena Suková 6–2, 6–3

References

External links
 ITF tournament edition details
 Tournament draws

Citizen Cup
WTA Hamburg
1990 in West German women's sport
1990 in German tennis